Robin Greenfield (born August 28, 1986) is an American environmental activist and adventurer. He is known for raising awareness for sustainability issues, often through attention-grabbing tactics.

Greenfield is also a writer, speaker, and ambassador to One Percent for the Planet.

Early life
Greenfield was born and raised in Ashland, Wisconsin, where he was raised by a single mother, along with his three siblings. At the age of 18 he became an Eagle Scout, the highest rank in Boy Scouts.

After graduating from Ashland High School in northern Wisconsin, Greenfield attended the University of Wisconsin–La Crosse, graduating with a Bachelor of Science degree in Biology. He traveled to six continents throughout his time in university and upon graduation. In 2011, Greenfield relocated to San Diego, California.

Adventurer
Through his adventures, Greenfield advocates for people to start living a happier, healthier lifestyle, to give back to others, and to live a simple earth-friendly life.

2013: Off the grid across America

On the journey, he carried out multiple campaigns to raise awareness about sustainability and how people can take action. To raise awareness about water waste, he lived off a leaky fire hydrant for five days in New York City. Later he cycled from New York City to Boston during a heat wave living solely on leaky faucets in a campaign called Drip by Drip.

2014: A year without showering

From April 2013 to April 2014, Greenfield spent a year bathing only in natural water sources such as rivers, lakes, waterfalls, and in the rain to raise awareness about consumption, water conservation, and living simply.  He was quoted as saying, "We have to be aware of the origin of the things we consume every day, such as water, food, and energy. In this case I wanted to show how valuable water is and inspire people to conserve and protect it."

2014: The food waste fiasco
Greenfield cycled across the US for the second time in the summer of 2014. In the first half of the ride, he volunteered at nonprofits, planted wildflowers and vegetables along his path, and promoted a healthy and waste-free existence. He left home with $2,000 in cash, no credit cards, and upon arrival in Madison, Wisconsin donated his last $421 to a non-profit. He then vowed to travel without money the rest of the way to New York City and eat solely by dumpster diving at grocery stores and convenience stores to draw attention to and find solutions for food waste.

He held Food Waste Fiascos in major cities in which the edible food he found in dumpsters was displayed in one spot to show how much of it there is. Greenfield said, 

The purpose of the campaign was to get grocery stores to donate the food they would otherwise throw away. The primary reason corporations have given for not donating their excess food is the fear of liability if someone gets sick from eating it. The Bill Emerson Good Samaritan Food Donation Act shields food donors from liability and a 2013 study by the University of Arkansas School of Law shows there has not been a single case that involved food donation-related liability for a grocery store.

2015/2016: Free Ride on Discovery Channel
In September 2015, Greenfield embarked on a journey to trek across South America with no money, instead relying on the goodness of others, making money from working, and sleeping rough. He had 72 days to cross over 9,000 kilometers. The goal was to attempt to live by Robin’s philosophy that you can travel the world relying on just your ingenuity and the kindness of strangers.  It was filmed by documentarian James Levelle for Discovery Channel. The mini-series was 6 episodes and aired on Discovery Channel in May 2016.

2016: Trash Me
In October 2016, Greenfield spent a month in New York City wearing all the trash he produced during the month on his body by storing the trash in a suit with clear plastic pockets, designed by trashion designer Nancy Judd. It was a visual demonstration of consumerism in the United States and how much trash an individual can create.

2017: Green Riders
In 2017, Greenfield organized a cross-country bike ride in which the bikers performed good deeds along the way, such as planting fruit trees, volunteering in community gardens, and picking up trash. The group of as many as 48 bikers travelled 3,700 miles from New York City to Seattle.

2019: Food freedom: a year without buying food
From November 2018 to November 2019, Greenfield lived in Orlando, Florida and ate only food that he could grow and forage. He grew over 100 different foods in gardens and foraged more than 200 foods from the wild, using skills he learned from local teachers. At the same time, he lived in a tiny house (his second—his first was in San Diego) that he built from recycled materials.

2020: Europe
In 2020, Greenfield toured Europe as part of his "World Solutions Tour".

Personal life
Greenfield focuses on sustainable living. He travels barefoot, and mostly by bicycle. He doesn't have credit cards or a retirement account and doesn't own a car. What allowed him to live in this manner is giving up the desire to be wealthy.

He aims to live a life that is beneficial to the Earth, to the community and self and aims to "lead by example and live it out loud".

Greenfield doesn't have a cellphone since January 2015 and doesn't own a car since 2011. In 2020 he had 44 possessions.

Greenfield stated that Mark Boyle's books changed his life.

He got a vasectomy at 25 because among other reasons he doesn't support the pharmaceutical industry and doesn't want women subjected to the hormones of birth control. He is founder of Community Fruit Trees, Free Seed Project, and Gardens for the People. He has vowed to earn less than the federal poverty threshold each year, donates 100% of his media income to grassroots non-profits, and his financial net worth is kept to a bare minimum.

Books

References

External links
 

Living people
1986 births
People from San Diego
People from Ashland, Wisconsin
University of Wisconsin–La Crosse alumni
21st-century American businesspeople
Activists from California
Simple living advocates